Kundapura Taluk is a taluk located in Udupi district in the Indian state of Karnataka. Kundapur town is the taluk headquarters of Kundapur Taluk.

Demographics
As of the 2011 Census of India, Kundapura Taluk had 79573 households with a population of 398471 of who 357798 were from rural areas and 40673 from urban. Of the population, 295664 people were literate.

Geography
Kundapur Taluk is bounded on the west by the Arabian Sea, on the south by Brahmavara Taluk, on the north by Byndoor Taluk, and the east by the Western Ghats.

Rivers
This taluk has several rivers and experiences heavy rainfall. The main rivers are the Chakra, Souparnika, Varahi, Kubja, and Kheta.
In fact, there are seven rivers or rivulets between Kundapur and Byndoor, a short distance of 36 km. They are Halady River, Kollur River, Chakra River, Rajadi, Nujadi, Yadamavina Hole and Uppunda Hole.

References

Taluks of Karnataka
Geography of Udupi district